The 2022–23 Memphis Grizzlies season is the 28th season of the franchise in the National Basketball Association (NBA) and 22nd in Memphis.

Draft

The Grizzlies had two first-round picks and one second-round pick entering the draft. On draft night, they traded the draft rights to TyTy Washington to the Houston Rockets.

Roster

Standings

Division

Conference

Game log

Preseason

|- style="background:#ccffcc;"
| 1
| October 1
| @ Milwaukee
| 
| David Roddy (18)
| Santi Aldama (7)
| Kennedy Chandler (8)
| Fiserv Forum13,023
| 1–0
|- style="background:#cfc;
| 2
| October 3
| Orlando
| 
| Ja Morant (22)
| John Konchar (9)
| Ja Morant (7)
| FedExForum13,431
| 2–0
|- style="background:#fcc;
| 3
| October 7
| Miami
| 
| Dillon Brooks (18)
| Steven Adams (8)
| Tyus Jones (5)
| FedExForum14,395
| 2–1
|- style="background:#fcc;
| 4
| October 11
| @ Orlando
| 
| Desmond Bane (33)
| Steven Adams (10)
| Brooks, Morant (4)
| Amway Center16,006
| 2–2
|- style="background:#cfc;
| 5
| October 13
| @ Detroit
| 
| Ja Morant (31)
| Adams, Aldama, Morant (8)
| Ja Morant (4) 
| Little Caesars Arena12,104
| 3–2

Regular season

|- style="background:#cfc;"
| 1
| October 19
| New York
| 
| Ja Morant (34)
| Steven Adams (14)
| Ja Morant (9)
| FedExForum18,202
| 1–0
|-style="background:#cfc;
| 2
| October 21
| @ Houston
| 
| Ja Morant (49)
| Adams, Aldama (9)
| Ja Morant (8)
| Toyota Center17,878
| 2–0
|- style="background:#fcc;"
| 3
| October 22
| @ Dallas
| 
| Ja Morant (20)
| Santi Aldama (6)
| Tyus Jones (5)
| American Airlines Center20,377
| 2–1
|- style="background:#cfc;"
| 4
| October 24
| Brooklyn
| 
| Bane, Morant (38)
| Steven Adams (13)
| Bane, Morant (7)
| FedExForum17,392
| 3–1
|-style="background:#cfc"
| 5
| October 27
| @ Sacramento
| 
| Desmond Bane (31)
| Steven Adams (11)
| Ja Morant (6)
| Golden 1 Center15,511
| 4–1
|-style="background:#fcc;
| 6
| October 29
| @ Utah
| 
| Desmond Bane (32)
| Steven Adams (10)
| Tyus Jones (10)
| Vivint Arena18,206
| 4–2
|-style="background:#fcc;
| 7
| October 31
| @ Utah
| 
| Ja Morant (37)
| Steven Adams (9)
| Ja Morant (4)
| Vivint Arena18,206
| 4–3

|-style="background:#cfc;
| 8
| November 2
| @ Portland
| 
| Desmond Bane (29)
| Steven Adams (11)
| Ja Morant (7)
| Moda Center19,462
| 5–3
|-style="background:#cfc;
| 9
| November 4
| Charlotte
| 
| Dillon Brooks (23)
| Steven Adams (19)
| Ja Morant (11)
| FedExForum17,187
| 6–3
|-style="background:#cfc;"
| 10
| November 6
| Washington
| 
| Desmond Bane (28)
| Adams, Aldama (10)
| Ja Morant (6)
| FedExForum16,877
| 7–3
|-style="background:#fcc;"
| 11
| November 7
| Boston
| 
| Ja Morant (30)
| Clarke, Morant (8)
| Ja Morant (9)
| FedExForum17,371
| 7–4
|- style="background:#cfc;"
| 12
| November 9
| @ San Antonio
| 
| Bane, Morant (32)
| Steven Adams (19)
| Desmond Bane (6)
| AT&T Center13,507
| 8–4
|-style="background:#cfc;"
| 13
| November 11
| Minnesota
| 
| Ja Morant (28)
| Ja Morant (10)
| Ja Morant (8)
| FedExForum16,939
| 9–4
|-style="background:#fcc;"
| 14
| November 13
| @ Washington
| 
| Dillon Brooks (19)
| Steven Adams (10)
| Steven Adams (6)
| Capital One Arena17,667
| 9–5
|-style="background:#fcc;"
| 15
| November 15
| @ New Orleans
| 
| Ja Morant (36)
| Brandon Clarke (13)
| Ja Morant (4)
| Smoothie King Center14,032
| 9–6
|-style="background:#cfc;"
| 16
| November 18
| Oklahoma City
| 
| Jaren Jackson Jr. (25)
| Jaren Jackson Jr. (12)
| Ja Morant (11)
| FedExForum17,324
| 10–6
|- style="background:#fcc;"
| 17
| November 20
| @ Brooklyn
| 
| Dillon Brooks (31)
| Steven Adams (10)
| John Konchar (7)
| Barclays Center18,241
| 10–7
|- style="background:#fcc;"
| 18
| November 22
| Sacramento
| 
| Ja Morant (34)
| Steven Adams (16)
| Jones, Morant (6)
| FedExForum16,826
| 10–8
|- style="background:#cfc;"
| 19
| November 25
| New Orleans
| 
| Dillon Brooks (25)
| Steven Adams (11)
| Ja Morant (11)
| FedExForum17,794
| 11–8
|- style="background:#cfc;"
| 20
| November 27
| @ New York
| 
| Ja Morant (27)
| Adams, Morant (10)
| Ja Morant (14)
| Madison Square Garden19,524
| 12–8
|- style="background:#fcc;"
| 21
| November 30
| @ Minnesota
| 
| Ja Morant (24)
| Steven Adams (12)
| Ja Morant (6)
| Target Center15,980
| 12–9

|- style="background:#cfc;"
| 22
| December 2
| Philadelphia
| 
| Ja Morant (28)
| Steven Adams (16)
| Steven Adams (6)
| FedExForum17,022
| 13–9
|- style="background:#cfc;"
| 23
| December 4
| @ Detroit
| 
| Ja Morant (33)
| Brandon Clarke (14)
| Ja Morant (10)
| Little Caesars Arena20,088
| 14–9
|- style="background:#cfc;"
| 24
| December 5
| Miami
| 
| Tyus Jones (28)
| Santi Aldama (10)
| Tyus Jones (10)
| FedExForum16,122
| 15–9
|- style="background:#cfc;"
| 25
| December 7
| Oklahoma City
| 
| Ja Morant (26)
| Ja Morant (13)
| Ja Morant (11)
| FedExForum15,942
| 16–9
|-style="background:#cfc;"
| 26
| December 9
| Detroit
| 
| Jaren Jackson Jr. (20)
| Steven Adams (8)
| Ja Morant (12)
| FedExForum17,103
| 17–9
|-style="background:#cfc;"
| 27
| December 12
| Atlanta
| 
| Tyus Jones (22)
| Jackson Jr., Konchar (7)
| Tyus Jones (11)
| FedExForum16,544
| 18–9
|-style="background:#cfc;"
| 28
| December 15
| Milwaukee
| 
| Ja Morant (25)
| Ja Morant (10)
| Ja Morant (10)
| FedExForum17,794
| 19–9
|-style="background:#fcc;"
| 29
| December 17
| @ Oklahoma City
| 
| Dillon Brooks (32)
| Clarke, Jackson Jr. (8)
| John Konchar (3)
| Paycom Center16,895
| 19–10
|-style="background:#fcc;"
| 30
| December 20
| @ Denver
| 
| Ja Morant (35)
| Steven Adams (10)
| Ja Morant (10)
| Ball Arena19,605
| 19–11
|-style="background:#cfc;"
| 31
| December 23
| @ Phoenix
| 
| Clarke, Jackson Jr. (24)
| Steven Adams (11)
| Ja Morant (11)
| Footprint Center17,071
| 20–11
|-style="background:#fcc;"
| 32
| December 25
| @ Golden State
| 
| Ja Morant (36)
| Steven Adams (14)
| Ja Morant (8)
| Chase Center18,064
| 20–12
|-style="background:#fcc;"
| 33
| December 27
| Phoenix
| 
| Ja Morant (34)
| Steven Adams (9)
| Ja Morant (6)
| FedExForum18,239
| 20–13
|-style="background:#cfc;"
| 34
| December 29
| @ Toronto
| 
| Dillon Brooks (25)
| Steven Adams (17)
| Ja Morant (17)
| Scotiabank Arena19,800
| 21–13
|-style="background:#cfc;"
| 35
| December 31
| New Orleans
| 
| Ja Morant (32)
| Steven Adams (21)
| Jones, Morant (8)
| FedExForum17,951
| 22–13

|-style="background:#cfc;"
| 36
| January 1
| Sacramento
| 
| Ja Morant (35)
| Steven Adams (23)
| Tyus Jones (8)
| FedExForum17,794
| 23–13
|-style="background:#cfc;" 
| 37
| January 4
| @ Charlotte
| 
| Ja Morant (23) 
| Steven Adams (15) 
| Ja Morant (8) 
| Spectrum Center19,077
| 24–13
|-style="background:#cfc;" 
| 38
| January 5
| @ Orlando
| 
| Ja Morant (32) 
| Jaren Jackson Jr. (10) 
| Tyus Jones (8) 
| Amway Center18,500
| 25–13
|-style="background:#cfc;"
| 39
| January 8
| Utah
| 
| Desmond Bane (24) 
| Xavier Tillman Sr. (9) 
| Desmond Bane (9)
| FedExForum17,794
| 26–13
|-style="background:#cfc;" 
| 40
| January 9
| San Antonio
| 
| Tyus Jones (24)
| Steven Adams (15)
| Tyus Jones (6)
| FedExForum16,013
| 27–13
|-style="background:#cfc;"
| 41
| January 11
| San Antonio
| 
| Ja Morant (38)
| Steven Adams (18)
| Steven Adams (5)
| FedExForum16,454
| 28–13
|-style="background:#cfc;"
| 42
| January 14
| @ Indiana
| 
| Desmond Bane (25)
| Jaren Jackson Jr. (10)
| Ja Morant (10)
| Gainbridge Fieldhouse17,274
| 29–13
|-style="background:#cfc;"
| 43
| January 16
| Phoenix
| 
| Ja Morant (29)
| Steven Adams (9)
| Tyus Jones (8)
| FedExForum17,794
| 30–13
|-style="background:#cfc;"
| 44
| January 18
| Cleveland
| 
| Desmond Bane (25)
| Steven Adams (10) 
| Ja Morant (8)
| FedExForum16,892
| 31–13
|-style="background:#fcc;"
| 45
| January 20
| @ L.A. Lakers
| 
| Ja Morant (22)
| Steven Adams (17) 
| Ja Morant (8) 
| Crypto.com Arena18,997
| 31–14
|-style="background:#fcc;"
| 46
| January 22
| @ Phoenix
| 
| Ja Morant (27) 
| Steven Adams (16) 
| Ja Morant (8)
| Footprint Center17,071
| 31–15
|-style="background:#fcc;"
| 47
| January 23
| @ Sacramento
| 
| Desmond Bane (21)
| Jones, Tillman Sr. (6)
| Tyus Jones (8)
| Golden 1 Center17,821
| 31–16
|-style="background:#fcc;"
| 48
| January 25
| @ Golden State
| 
| Ja Morant (29)
| Brandon Clarke (8)
| Ja Morant (12) 
| Chase Center18,064
| 31–17
|-style="background:#fcc;"
| 49
| January 27
| @ Minnesota
| 
| Ja Morant (27)
| Ja Morant (10)
| Ja Morant (11) 
| Target Center17,136
| 31–18
|-style="background:#cfc;"
| 50
| January 29
| Indiana
| 
| Jaren Jackson Jr. (28)
| Xavier Tillman Sr. (11)
| Ja Morant (15)
| FedExForum17,794
| 32–18
|-

|-style="background:#fcc;"
| 51
| February 1
| Portland
| 
| Ja Morant (32)
| Xavier Tillman Sr. (10)
| Ja Morant (12)
| FedExForum14,589
| 32–19
|-style="background:#fcc;"
| 52
| February 2
| @ Cleveland
| 
| Desmond Bane (25)
| Santi Aldama (10)
| Ja Morant (8)
| Rocket Mortgage FieldHouse19,432
| 32–20
|-style="background:#fcc;"
| 53
| February 5
| Toronto
| 
| Desmond Bane (26)
| Xavier Tillman Sr. (9)
| Tyus Jones (7)
| FedExForum17,794
| 32–21
|-style="background:#cfc;"
| 54
| February 7
| Chicago
| 
| Ja Morant (34)
| Brandon Clarke (13)
| Ja Morant (7)
| FedExForum17,012
| 33–21
|-style="background:#cfc;"
| 55
| February 10
| Minnesota
| 
| Ja Morant (32)
| Ja Morant (9)
| Ja Morant (9)
| FedExForum17,794
| 34–21
|-style="background:#fcc;"
| 56
| February 12
| @ Boston
| 
| Ja Morant (25)
| Aldama, Jackson Jr. (7)
| Bane, Morant (7)
| TD Garden19,156
| 34–22
|-style="background:#cfc;"
| 57
| February 15
| Utah
| 
| Jaren Jackson Jr. (26)
| Brandon Clarke (10)
| Ja Morant (9)
| FedExForum16,748
| 35–22
|-style="background:#fcc;"
| 58
| February 23
| @ Philadelphia
| 
| Desmond Bane (25)
| Xavier Tillman Sr. (12)
| Tyus Jones (6)
| Wells Fargo Center21,205
| 35–23
|-style="background:#cfc;"
| 59
| February 25
| Denver
| 
| Ja Morant (23)
| Brandon Clarke (9)
| Tyus Jones (5)
| FedExForum18,302
| 36–23
|-style="background:#cfc;"
| 60
| February 28
| L.A. Lakers
| 
| Ja Morant (39)
| Xavier Tillman Sr. (11)
| Ja Morant (10)
| FedExForum17,794
| 37–23

|-style="background:#cfc;"
| 61
| March 1
| @ Houston
| 
| Desmond Bane (30)
| Desmond Bane (9)
| Ja Morant (7)
| Toyota Center15,919
| 38–23
|-style="background:#fcc;"
| 62
| March 3
| @ Denver
| 
| Ja Morant (27)
| Xavier Tillman Sr. (10)
| Ja Morant (10)
| Ball Arena 19,641
| 38–24
|-style="background:#fcc;"
| 63
| March 5
| @ L.A. Clippers
| 
| Desmond Bane (30)
| Jackson Jr., Tillman Sr. (5)
| Tyus Jones (12)
| Crypto.com Arena 19,068
| 38–25
|-style="background:#fcc;"
| 64
| March 7
| @ L.A. Lakers
| 
| Jaren Jackson Jr. (26)
| Xavier Tillman Sr. (10)
| Bane, Kennard (5)
| Crypto.com Arena 18,997
| 38–26
|-style="background:#cfc;"
| 65
| March 9
| Golden State
| 
| Tyus Jones (22)
| Jaren Jackson Jr. (9)
| Tyus Jones (11)
| FedExForum 17,794
| 39–26
|-style="background:#cfc;"
| 66
| March 11
| Dallas
| 
| Desmond Bane (25)
| Xavier Tillman Sr. (8)
| Tyus Jones (10)
| FedExForum17,794
| 40–26
|-style="background:#cfc;"
| 67
| March 13
| @ Dallas
| 
| Desmond Bane (23)
| Santi Aldama (9)
| Desmond Bane (7)
| American Airlines Center20,303
| 41–26
|-style="background:#fcc;"
| 68
| March 15
| @ Miami
| 
| Jaren Jackson Jr. (25)
| Jaren Jackson Jr. (9)
| Tyus Jones (5)
| Miami-Dade Arena19,794
| 41–27
|-style="background:#cfc;"
| 69
| March 17
| @ San Antonio
| 
| Jaren Jackson Jr. (28)
| Tyus Jones (10)
| Tyus Jones (10)
| AT&T Center15,221
| 42–27
|-style="background:#cfc;"
| 70
| March 18
| Golden State
| 
| Jaren Jackson Jr. (31)
| Xavier Tillman Sr. (10)
| Tyus Jones (14)
| FedExForum18,396
| 43–27

Transactions

Trades

Free agents

Re-signed

Additions

Subtractions

Incidents
Ja Morant was suspended for 2 games after he flashed his gun at a strip club on Instagram Live, one against the Los Angeles Clippers and Los Angeles Lakers. He is currently under investigation by a Denver are police department for the incident.

References

Memphis Grizzlies
Memphis Grizzlies seasons
Memphis Grizzlies
Memphis Grizzlies
Events in Memphis, Tennessee